Banki is a Vidhan Sabha constituency of Cuttack district, Odisha.

This constituency includes Banki, Banki block, Banki-Dampada block and eight Gram panchayats (Narajmarthapur, Ramdaspur, Madhupur, Belagachhia, Dadhapatana, Kunheipada, Mundali and Sribantapur) of Barang block.

Elected Members

Fourteen elections were held between 1951 and 2009.
Elected members from the Banki constituency are:

2009: (88): Pravata KumarTripathy (BJD)
2004: (46): Debasis Pattnaik (Congress)
2000: (46): Pravata KumarTripathy (BJD)
1995: (46): Pravata KumarTripathy (Janata Dal)
1990: (46): Ghanashyam Sahoo (Janata Dal)
1985: (46): Akshaya Kumar Patnaik (Congress)
1980: (46): Akshaya Kumar Patnaik  (Congress-I)
1977: (46): Jogesh Chandra Rout (Congress)
1974: (46): Jogesh Chandra Rout (Independent)
1971: (43): Gokulananda Prahataj (Utkal Congress)
1967: (43): Jogesh Chandra Rout (Independent)
1961: (96): Gokulananda Prahataj (PSP)
1957: (67): Jogesh Chandra Rout (Congress)
1951: (80): Gokulananda Prahataj (Socialist)

2019 Election Result

2014 Election Result

2009 Election Results
In 2009 election, Biju Janata Dal candidate Pravata KumarTripathy defeated Indian National Congress candidate Debasis Patnaik by a margin of 23,445 votes.

Notes

References

Assembly constituencies of Odisha
Politics of Cuttack district